"To Make a Man (Feel Like a Man)" is a song written and originally performed by American country music artist Loretta Lynn. It was released as a single in June 1969 via Decca Records.

Background and reception 
"To Make a Man (Feel Like a Man)" was recorded at the Bradley's Barn on May 28, 1969. Located in Mount Juliet, Tennessee, the session was produced by renowned country music producer Owen Bradley. Two additional tracks were recorded during this session. 

"To Man a Man (Feel Like a Man)" reached number three on the Billboard Hot Country Singles survey in 1969. The song became her sixteenth top ten single under the Decca recording label. Additionally, the song peaked at number four on the Canadian RPM Country Songs chart during this same period. It was included on her studio album, Woman of the World / To Make a Man (1969).

Track listings 
7" vinyl single
 "To Make a Man (Feel Like a Man)" – 2:15
 "One Little Reason" – 2:47

Charts

Weekly charts

References 

1969 songs
1969 singles
Decca Records singles
Loretta Lynn songs
Songs written by Loretta Lynn
Song recordings produced by Owen Bradley